North Newton is the name of the following places: 

North Newton, Kansas, United States of America
North Newton Township, Pennsylvania, United States of America
North Newton, Somerset, United Kingdom